Roland Joffé (born 17 November 1945) is a British director and producer of film and television, known for the Academy Award-winning films The Killing Fields and The Mission. He began his career in television, his early credits including episodes of Coronation Street and an adaptation of The Stars Look Down for Granada. He gained a reputation for hard-hitting political stories with the series Bill Brand and factual dramas for Play for Today.

Education
Joffé was educated at two independent schools: the Lycée Français Charles de Gaulle in London, and Carmel College in Wallingford, Oxfordshire, which was Europe's only Jewish boarding school, until it closed in 1997. He completed his formal education at the University of Manchester.

Career

TV director
After university, Joffé joined Granada Television as a trainee director in 1973, where he directed episodes of  Coronation Street, Sam, The Stars Look Down, Crown Court, Bill Brand, and Headmaster.

In 1977, producer Tony Garnett was commissioned by the BBC to direct the play The Spongers within BBCs Play for Today series. He informed the BBC drama department that he wanted to hire Roland Joffé as director, but was told that Joffé did not possess BBC clearance and was regarded a "security risk" (see: "Christmas tree" list). The reason was that Joffé had attended some Workers' Revolutionary Party meetings in the early 1970s, although he never became a party member. He explained around 1988: "I was very interested in politics at that time. But I was interested in what all the political parties were doing, not just the WRP, and I was never actively involved." Only after Garnett threatened he would "go public", was the veto on Joffé's appointment withdrawn. The Spongers won the prestigious Prix Italia award.

Joffé also directed an episode in BBC's Second City Firsts in 1977 and later directed two more plays for Play for Today: The Legion Hall Bombing (1979) and United Kingdom (1981). In 1979, he directed the TV play No, Mama, No by Verity Bargate for the ITV Playhouse series, and in 1980 he made a version of 17th century dramatist John Ford's play 'Tis Pity She's a Whore as a TV film for the BBC.

Film director
Roland Joffé's first two feature films (The Killing Fields, 1984, and The Mission, 1986) each garnered him an Academy Award nomination for Best Director. Joffé worked closely with producer David Puttnam on each film. The Killing Fields detailed the friendship of two men, an American journalist for The New York Times, and his translator, a prisoner of the Khmer Rouge in Communist Cambodia. It won three Academy Awards (for Best Supporting Actor, Best Cinematography, and Best Film Editing) and was nominated for four more (including Best Picture and Best Director). The Mission was a story of conflict between Jesuit missionaries in South America, who were trying to convert the Guaraní Indians, and the Portuguese and Spanish colonisers, who wanted to enslave the natives. In an interview with Thomas Bird, Joffé says of The Mission, "The Indians are innocent. The film is about what happens in the world . . . what that innocence brings out in us. You would sit in a cinema in New York, or in Tokyo, or Paris, and for that point of time you would be joined with your companions on this planet. You would come out with a real sense of a network.". The film won the Palme d'Or and Technical Grand Jury Prize at the 1986 Cannes Film Festival. It achieved six Academy Awards nominations—including for Best Picture, Best Director, and Ennio Morricone's acclaimed Best Original Score—and won one, for Best Cinematography.

In 1993, he produced and partially directed a big budget adaptation of the video game Super Mario Bros.. The film struggled to make back its budget. His 1995 adaptation of The Scarlet Letter was a critical and financial disaster, and his 2007 horror film Captivity drew controversy with its advertising billboards, widely regarded as exploitative and misogynistic. He received Razzie Nominations for Worst Director for The Scarlet Letter and Captivity.

His 2011 release, There Be Dragons, garnered press attention as it dealt with the Catholic organisation Opus Dei. A movie about faith and forgiveness, There Be Dragons is a project that Joffé says has a message he's proud to say on film. In an interview with CBN.com, he stated, "I have a very deep emotional investment in this film. I feel that I really want to stand behind what it says to us as human beings."

In 2013 Joffé directed the Anglo-Indian historical epic romance time travel adventure film, The Lovers.

Personal life
Joffé is of Jewish descent but has described himself as a "wobbly agnostic". He is not related to the French film director Arthur Joffé, as is often incorrectly stated.  

Around 1950, Roland's father Mark Joffe began a relationship with the daughter of Jacob Epstein and Kathleen Garman, Esther Garman, who helped raise Roland. After Esther's suicide in 1954, Roland lived with her parents. Portraits of Roland as a child by Jacob Epstein and Esther's brother Theodore Garman are part of the Garman Ryan Collection at The New Art Gallery Walsall.

From 1974 to 1980, Joffé was married to actress Jane Lapotaire; they have a son, screenwriter and director Rowan Joffé (b. 1973). Later, he and actress Cherie Lunghi were in a longterm relationship; they have a daughter, actor Nathalie Lunghi (b. 1986). 

Joffé is a board member of the nonprofit organization Operation USA. He was the official patron of the 2011 Cambodia Volleyball World Cup held from 23 to 29 July at the National Olympic Stadium Phnom Penh. Roland Joffé lives on the island of Malta and is an active member of the team organising the Valletta Film Festival.

Filmography

Film

Television

Accolades

References

External links
 
 
 
 
 BOMB Magazine interview with Roland Joffé by Thomas Bird (Winter, 1987)

1945 births
Living people
Directors of Palme d'Or winners
English agnostics
English expatriates in France
English film producers
British people of Jewish descent
English television directors
Film directors from London
French agnostics
French film directors
French film producers
French television directors
Jewish agnostics
Naturalized citizens of France
People educated at Lycée Français Charles de Gaulle
Prix Italia winners
British emigrants to France